Sofía Toro Prieto-Puga (born 19 August 1990, in A Coruña) is a Spanish sailor. She won a gold medal at the 2012 Summer Olympics in Elliott 6m class. She was in a crew led by Támara Echegoyen along with Ángela Pumariega.

See also
 List of Olympic medalists in sailing

Notes

References

External links
 
 
 
 
 Sofia Toro Prieto Puga at London2012.com
 

Spanish female sailors (sport)
1984 births
Living people
Olympic sailors of Spain
Sailors at the 2012 Summer Olympics – Elliott 6m
Olympic gold medalists for Spain
Olympic medalists in sailing
Sportspeople from A Coruña
Medalists at the 2012 Summer Olympics
Real Club Náutico de La Coruña